The 1888 Indianapolis Hoosiers finished with a 50–85 record in the National League, finishing in seventh place.

Offseason 
October 20, 1887: Gid Gardner and cash were traded by the Hoosiers to the Washington Nationals for Paul Hines.

Regular season

Season standings

Record vs. opponents

Opening Day lineup

Roster

Player stats

Batting

Starters by position 
Note: Pos = Position; G = Games played; AB = At bats; H = Hits; Avg. = Batting average; HR = Home runs; RBI = Runs batted in

Other batters 
Note: G = Games played; AB = At bats; H = Hits; Avg. = Batting average; HR = Home runs; RBI = Runs batted in

Pitching

Starting pitchers 
Note: G = Games pitched; IP = Innings pitched; W = Wins; L = Losses; ERA = Earned run average; SO = Strikeouts

Relief pitchers 
Note: G = Games pitched; W = Wins; L = Losses; SV = Saves; ERA = Earned run average; SO = Strikeouts

Notes

References 
 1888 Indianapolis Hoosiers team page at Baseball Reference

Indianapolis Hoosiers
Indianapolis Hoosiers season